Blake Whittfield Ferguson (born April 21, 1997) is an American football long snapper for the Miami Dolphins of the National Football League (NFL). He played college football at LSU, winning a national championship in 2020.

College career
Ferguson played college football for LSU from 2015 to 2019. He played in 52 games at long snapper, and was also a two-year captain of the team.

Professional career
Ferguson was selected by the Miami Dolphins in the sixth round (185th overall) of the 2020 NFL Draft. He signed a four-year contract on May 10. He was placed on the reserve/COVID-19 list by the Dolphins on July 27, 2020, and was activated from the list six days later.

Personal life
He is the younger brother of Buffalo Bills long snapper Reid Ferguson.
He has type 1 diabetes.

References

External links
 LSU bio

1997 births
Living people
American football long snappers
LSU Tigers football players
Miami Dolphins players
People from Smyrna, Georgia
Players of American football from Georgia (U.S. state)
Sportspeople from Cobb County, Georgia